Hypotrachyna lueckingii is a species of foliose lichen in the family Parmeliaceae. Found in Costa Rica, it was described as new to science in 2011.

References

lueckingii
Lichen species
Lichens described in 2011
Lichens of Central America
Taxa named by Harrie Sipman